Raúl Eduardo Castro Stagnaro (born 5 July 1952) is a Peruvian lawyer and politician who is a former Congressman, representing Lima elected in the 2006 election under the National Unity list for the 2006–2011 term. In the 2016 election, Castro Stagnaro tried to run for Congress again in the Lima constituency, under the Popular Alliance under number 2 of the list, which grouped Alan García’s APRA, and the Christian People’s Party, but he was not elected. In party level, he served as President of the Christian People's Party from 2011 and 2016. He was also it's party Secretary General from 2006 and 2011 and as Vice President of the Party from 1999 to 2006.

Biography

Education 
Raúl Castro Stagnaro studied at the Antonio Raimondi Italian School (Lima). His university studies were carried out at the Pontifical Catholic University of Peru, where he studied Law and Political Science.

He is the director of the Castro Stagnaro & Association Law Firm.

Political career

Congressman 
Castro Stagnaro is former Congressman, representing Lima, elected in the 2006 election under the National Unity list for the 2006–2011 term.

Post-congressional career 
In the 2016 election, Castro Stagnaro tried to run for Congress again in the Lima constituency, under the Popular Alliance under number 2 of the list, which grouped Alan García’s APRA, and the Christian People’s Party, but he was not elected.

Party politics 
In party level, he served as President of the Christian People's Party from 2011 to 2016. He was also it's party secretary general from 2006 and 2011 and as Vice President of the Party from 1999 to 2006.

External links

Official Congressional Site

Living people
Christian People's Party (Peru) politicians
National Unity (Peru) politicians
1952 births
Members of the Congress of the Republic of Peru

Pontifical Catholic University of Peru alumni
20th-century Peruvian lawyers
People from Lima